Space Walk is an album by British jazz saxophonist Don Rendell, recorded in December 1970 and released on the EMI Columbia label in 1972 as part of their Lansdowne Series. This was Rendell's final recording under the Lansdowne banner before moving to Spotlite Records. Space Walk continued Rendell's exploration of modern modal jazz and displayed the enduring influence of John Coltrane on Rendell's composition and playing.

Reception

In a reissue review of Space Walk, AllAboutJazz scored the album 3 ½ stars, considering the album's music to be "vigorous and adventurous" but one that fell "outside the prevailing currents of jazz rock and free jazz". In a more sympathetic reappraisal of Space Walk as part of a 2021 reissue by Decca Records, Jazzwise noted that Rendell bravely deviated from the brass and saxophone orthodoxy of the time by using twin tenor saxophones in the frontline. The composition, "Euroaquillo", was also highlighted as best exemplifying Rendell's "affinity to post-hard-bop-into-middle-period-Coltrane". Jazzwise awarded the album 4 stars and the status of "Editor's choice".

Track listing 
All compositions by Don Rendell except where noted.
 "On the Way" - 5:45
 "Antibes" - 7:10
 "Summer Song" - 6:18
 "The Street Called Straight" - 5:27
 "Euroaquilo" (Stan Robinson) - 7:16
 "A Matter of Time" (Dave Quincy, Trevor Tomkins) - 5:29
 "Space Walk" (Peter Shade) - 5:29

Personnel 
 Don Rendell – tenor saxophone, soprano saxophone, flute, alto flute
 Stan Robinson – tenor saxophone, clarinet, flute
 Peter Shade – vibraphone, flute
 Jack Thorncraft – bass, acoustic
 Trevor Tomkins – percussion

References 

1972 albums
Spotlite Records albums
Modal jazz albums